"Tegami" is the second single the vocal group Bright released under a major label named Rhythm Zone. The song Tegami is a ballad collaboration song between Bright and the Korean J-pop singer K. The single got weekly the #39 spot on the Oricon ranking and sold 1,941 copies in its first week.

Track listing 
Tegami feat. K (手紙; Letter)
One Summer Time
Stay
Free Your Mind
Brightest Star Cubismo Grafico remix
Tegami feat. K (instrumental)
One Summer Time (instrumental)
Free Your Mind (instrumental)

DVD track list
 手紙 feat. K (music video)
 One Summer Time (music video)
 手紙 feat. K (making-off video)

Chart

References

2008 singles
Bright (Japanese band) songs
Rhythm Zone singles
Song articles with missing songwriters
2008 songs